Palo is a hamlet in Rosemound Rural Municipality No.378, Saskatchewan, Canada. Palo used to have a Grand Trunk Pacific Railway station, and is near Canadian National Railway's Wainwright Subdivision. Palo is still home to the Palo mine facility.

Industries

The Palo Mine is owned by Nanostructured Minerals and supplies sodium sulphate with a purity of 98 to 99%. Nanostructured Minerals is 51% owned by Logician Minerals of Hong Kong while ZEOX of Canada owns 49% and operates the facility.  The Whitehorse Lake bed is the mineral source.

In October 2008, Otish signed an agreement with Nanostructured Minerals to acquire potash mineral rights in the Palo area.

See also
 List of communities in Saskatchewan
 Hamlets of Saskatchewan

References

Rosemount No. 378, Saskatchewan
Unincorporated communities in Saskatchewan
Ghost towns in Saskatchewan
Mines in Saskatchewan